Nisson is an unincorporated community in Grays Harbor County, in the U.S. state of Washington.

History
A post office called Nisson was established in 1912, and remained in operation until 1917. The community was named after a pioneer lumberman.

References

Unincorporated communities in Grays Harbor County, Washington
Unincorporated communities in Washington (state)